Lixadmontia is a genus of tachinid flies in the family Tachinidae.

Species
Lixadmontia franki Wood & Cave, 2006

Distribution
Guatemala, Honduras.

References

Exoristinae
Diptera of North America
Tachinidae genera
Monotypic Brachycera genera